Chocolate Cortés is a Puerto Rico-based multinational company and one of the largest chocolate manufacturers in the Caribbean. It has operations based in the Dominican Republic and Puerto Rico and runs restaurants in San Juan and New York City under the Chocobar name.

References

External links 
 Official website

1929 establishments in Puerto Rico
Confectionery companies of the United States
Chocolate companies based in Puerto Rico